Eleni Teloni (born December 16, 1964 in Limassol) is a retired female hammer thrower from Cyprus. She set her personal best throw (65.04 metres) on July 24, 2003 at a meet in Athens, Greece.

Achievements

See also
Cypriot records in athletics

References

sports-reference

1964 births
Living people
Cypriot female hammer throwers
Athletes (track and field) at the 2002 Commonwealth Games
Commonwealth Games competitors for Cyprus
Athletes (track and field) at the 2004 Summer Olympics
Olympic athletes of Cyprus
Sportspeople from Limassol
Athletes (track and field) at the 1991 Mediterranean Games
Athletes (track and field) at the 2001 Mediterranean Games
Mediterranean Games competitors for Cyprus